The cation-chloride cotransporter (CCC) family (TC# 2.A.30) is part of the APC superfamily of secondary carriers. Members of the CCC family are found in animals, plants, fungi and bacteria. Most characterized CCC family proteins are from higher eukaryotes, but one has been partially characterized from Nicotiana tabacum (a plant), and homologous ORFs have been sequenced from Caenorhabditis elegans (worm), Saccharomyces cerevisiae (yeast) and Synechococcus sp. (blue green bacterium). The latter proteins are of unknown function. These proteins show sequence similarity to members of the APC family (TC #2.A.3). CCC family proteins are usually large (between 1000 and 1200 amino acyl residues), and possess 12 putative transmembrane spanners (TMSs) flanked by large N-terminal and C-terminal hydrophilic domains.

Function
CCC family proteins can catalyze NaCl/KCl symport, NaCl symport, or KCl symport depending on the system. The NaCl/KCl symporters are specifically inhibited by bumetanide while the NaCl symporters are specifically inhibited by thiazide. One member of the CCC family, the thiazide-sensitive NaCl cotransporter (NCC) of man is involved in 5% of the filtered load of NaCl in the kidney. Mutations in NCC cause the recessive Gitelman syndrome. NCC is a dimer in the membrane. It is regulated by RasGRP1.

Transport reaction
The generalized transport reaction for CCC family symporters is:

{Na+ + K+ + 2Cl−} (out) ⇌ {Na+ + K+ + 2Cl−} (in).

That for the NaCl and KCl symporters is:

{Na+ or K+ + Cl−} (out) ⇌ {Na+ or K+ + Cl−} (in).

Structure
NCC proteins are dimers in the membrane and contain 12 TMSs.

Two splice variants of NKCC2 are identical except for a 23 aa membrane domain. They have different affinities for Na+, K+ and Cl−. This segment (residues 216-233 in NKCC2) were examined for ion selectivity. Residue 216 affects K+ binding while residue 220 only affects Na+ binding. These two sites are presumed to be adjacent to each other.

Each of the major types of CCC family members in mammals exist as paralogous isoforms. These may differ in substrates transported. For example, of the four currently recognized KCl transporters, KCC1 and KCC4 both recognize KCl with similar affinities, but KCC1 exhibits anion selectivity: Cl− > SCN− = Br− > PO > I−, while KCl4 exhibits anion selectivity: Cl− > Br− > PO = I− > SCN−. Both are activated by cell swelling under hypotonic conditions. These proteins may cotransport water (H2O).

CCCs share a conserved structural scaffold that consists of a transmembrane transport domain followed by a cytoplasmic regulatory domain. Warmuth et al. (2009) determined the x-ray structure of the C-terminal domain of a CCC from the archaeon Mehanosarcina acetivorans. It shows a novel fold of a regulatory domain, distantly related to universal stress proteins. The protein forms dimers in solution, consistent with the proposed dimeric organization of eukaryotic CCC transporters.

See also
 APC Superfamily
 SLC12A9 
 SLC12A8
 Chloride potassium symporter 5
 Transporter Classification Database

References

Protein families
Solute carrier family